Hypareva is a genus of moths in the subfamily Arctiinae. The genus was erected by George Hampson in 1900.

Species
 Hypareva pogonoda Hampson, 1900
 Hypareva laticilia (Druce, 1885)

References

External links

Lithosiini
Moth genera